A referendum on Welsh independence from the United Kingdom (UK) has been proposed by pro-independence supporters, including independence campaign group YesCymru, pro-independence political party Plaid Cymru and other groups and individuals.
These follow similar calls for a proposed second Scottish independence referendum. Pro-independence party Plaid Cymru has pledged to hold a referendum should they win a majority of seats in the Senedd.

Referendum proposals 
In March 2017, following calls for a second referendum on Scottish independence, Plaid Cymru leader Leanne Wood said there needed to be a national debate on Welsh independence. In July 2020, Plaid brought forward a motion to discuss a referendum on Welsh independence, but it was rejected by 43 votes to 9. 

On 24 October 2020, Wales Green Party members voted at their party conference that the party would support Welsh independence in the event of a referendum being held on whether or not Wales should become independent from the United Kingdom.

In July 2020, Plaid Cymru tabled a motion for Welsh ministers to seek permission from Westminster for the right of the Senedd to legislate for a Welsh independence referendum. The members of Senedd rejected this motion by 43 votes to 9. This was the first time in history that Welsh independence was debated in the Senedd.

On 11 December 2020, Plaid Cymru leader Adam Price stated that if his party won a majority at the 2021 Senedd election, an independence referendum would be held in its first term in office. At Plaid's special conference on independence, held on 13 February 2021, party members formally approved Price's pledge to hold a referendum in or before 2026.

In June 2022, the UK Government announced its intention to repeal the Welsh Government's Trade Union (Wales) Act 2017, which bans agency staff from being used if public sector workers go on strike. Price called this a "power grab" and "potentially devolution's breaking point", and called for a referendum to be held in order to protect the Senedd's powers. Price stated in a radio interview in June 2022, "If the Supreme Court decides in favour, we in Wales will have a route to go directly to the people of Wales in order to have a mandate for securing our own right to self-determination as a nation." The UK government states that "industrial relations" are a reserved matter to the UK Government but the Welsh government said it would "resist" attempts to undermine legislation that is passed by the Senedd.

A petition was made to the UK government and parliament requesting a referendum on Welsh independence which gathered over 8,000 signatures.

A YouGov poll in January 2021 found that 31% of people in Wales support holding a referendum on Welsh independence within the next five years with 47% opposing.

Route to a referendum 
First Minister of Wales, Mark Drakeford has stated "If a party that stands for that at an election wins a majority of votes in Wales, then, of course, that referendum should happen."

Emyr Lewis, Head of the Department of Law and Criminology at Aberystwyth University has said that there is no great difference between the situation in Wales and Scotland when it comes to the right to hold an independence without Westminster transfer of powers to do so. Under the Government of Wales Act 2006, the legislative powers of the Senedd, similarly to the Scottish Parliament cannot pass legislation that affects the constitution of the United Kingdom and the London Parliament.

Lewis notes that there is however a potential route for a referendum on independence without Westminster involvement. Under Section 64 of the Welsh Government Act 2006 however, the Welsh Government has the power to hold a poll (referendum) "for the purpose of ascertaining the views of those polled about whether or how any of the functions of the Welsh Ministers...should be exercised." Section 60 of the 2006 Act also states that the Welsh Government may do whatever is appropriate "in order to achieve...promote or improve the economic, social and environmental welfare of Wales". If the Welsh government considered independence to be a benefit to the economic welfare of Wales, it could potentially ask the opinion of the people of Wales in a referendum on independence. There is no section in the Scotland Act 1998 which corresponds to sections 60 or 64 which were in place at a time when the devolution settlement in Wales was different to what is it now. Lewis notes that a court of law may not accept section 60 in a broad sense that may apply to an independence referendum.

Opposition 
The leader of the Conservatives in Wales and the leader of the Liberal Democrats in Wales have shown opposition to a potential referendum on Welsh independence.

Opinion polling 

There have been multiple public opinion polls on how people in Wales would vote in a potential Welsh independence referendum. Support for Welsh independence has been steadily rising but is currently a minority opinion.

See also 
 2014 Scottish independence referendum
 United Ireland
 English independence
 Potential breakup of the United Kingdom

References 

Celtic nationalism
Separatism in the United Kingdom
Politics of Wales
Welsh nationalism
Referendum on independence
Proposed referendums